Czeberaki may refer to the following villages in Poland:
 Czeberaki, Lublin Voivodeship (east Poland)
 Czeberaki, Masovian Voivodeship (east-central Poland)